This is a list of International rankings of North Macedonia

References

North Macedonia